Thiruvidaimarudur is a state assembly constituency in Thanjavur district in Tamil Nadu. It is one of the 234 State Legislative Assembly Constituencies in Tamil Nadu, in India. Elections and winners in the constituency are listed below.

Members of the Assembly

Election results

2021

2016

2011

2006

2001

1996

1991

1989

1984

1980

1977

References 

 

Assembly constituencies of Tamil Nadu
Thanjavur district